Joseph Shane Nance (born September 7, 1977) is a former Major League Baseball pitcher.

College career
Nance attended the University of Houston, where he played college baseball for the Cougars.  While there, he was named to the All-Tournament Team at the 1999 Conference USA baseball tournament, in which Houston was the runner-up.  He was named to the team again in the 2000 tournament, which Houston won.

Professional career
Nance never pitched more than 24 innings in a major league season as his seasons were cut short by trips up and down to the minor leagues. Nance's career ERA was 5.02 with a win–loss record of 1-3. Nance retired after the  season.
He now has two children with his wife.

References

External links

1977 births
Living people
Baseball players from Texas
Major League Baseball pitchers
Arizona Diamondbacks players
Milwaukee Brewers players
Yakima Bears players
Vero Beach Dodgers players
Jacksonville Suns players
Las Vegas 51s players
Indianapolis Indians players
Tucson Sidewinders players
Omaha Royals players
Houston Cougars baseball players